Turgot may refer to:

 Turgot of Durham ( – 1115), Prior of Durham and Bishop of St Andrews
 Michel-Étienne Turgot (1690–1751), mayor of Paris
 Anne Robert Jacques Turgot (1727–1781), French economist and statesman
 Louis Félix Étienne, marquis de Turgot (1796–1866), French diplomat
 Sébastien Turgot (born 1984), French cyclist

See also
 Turgut (disambiguation)

Surnames of Norman origin
French-language surnames